30 Aniversario is an album by Tommy Olivencia.

30 Aniversario may also refer to:

30 Aniversario, album by Los Temerarios
30 Aniversario En Vivo, album by Los Invasores de Nuevo León
30 Aniversario Bailando Con El Mundo, album by El Gran Combo
30 Aniversario, album by Grupo Pegasso
30 Aniversario, album by Margarita Vargas La Diosa De La Cumbia
30 Aniversario, album by Manolo Escobar
30 Aniversario, album by Raphy Leavitt
30 Aniversario, album by Los Yonic's
30 Aniversario, compilation album by Oscar D'Leon
30 Aniversario, album by Juan Formell and Van Van
30 Aniversario, album by Conjunto Primavera
30 Aniversario, album by Orquesta La Solución
30 Aniversario, album by Mocedades
30 Aniversario, album by Sandro de América 
30 Aniversario - En Concierto, album by Olga Guillot